Alamat may refer to:

 Alamat (group), a Filipino boy band 
 Alamat (TV program), a Philippine television drama
 Filipino word for legend or folklore